Hahncappsia jacalensis is a moth in the family Crambidae. It was described by Hahn William Capps in 1967 and it is found in Hidalgo, Mexico.

The wingspan is about 21 mm.

References

Moths described in 1967
Pyraustinae